Hans Abel, a painter from Frankfurt, who lived around 1494, is believed to have painted some of the windows which adorn the Frankfurt Cathedral and several churches in that city. He also painted banners and coats of arms.

References
 

Gothic painters
15th-century German painters
German male painters
Year of birth unknown
Year of death unknown
Artists from Frankfurt